The 2015 New Zealand Grand Prix event for open wheel racing cars was held at Manfeild Autocourse near Feilding on 15 February 2015. It was the sixtieth New Zealand Grand Prix and was open to Toyota Racing Series cars. The event was also the third race of the fifth round of the 2015 Toyota Racing Series, the final race of the series.

Twenty Tatuus-Toyota cars started the race which was won by 16-year-old Canadian Lance Stroll who became the who became the third teenager in as many years to claim the Grand Prix after Mitch Evans and Nick Cassidy.

The race was dominated by the M2 Competition outfit, with Arjun Maini taking pole position, Brandon Maïsano the fastest lap and locked out the podium with Stroll winning, Charlie Eastwood second and Maisano third.

Results

Qualifying

Race

References

External links
 Toyota Racing Series

Grand Prix
New Zealand Grand Prix
Toyota Racing Series
February 2015 sports events in New Zealand